Reggae Night is a 2004 compilation album by reggae artist Jimmy Cliff that included the track for the famous same-titled single "Reggae Night" and "You Can Get It If You Really Want". The album was released on Planet Song label.

Track listing
"Reggae Night"
"You Can Get It If You Really Want"
"Samba Reggae"
"I'm A Winner"
"Breakout"
"Oneness"
"Peace"
"War A Africa"
"Roll on Rolling Stone"
"Be Ready"
"Jimmy Jimmy"
"Haunted"
"Baby Let Me Feel It"
"Stepping Out of Limbo"
"True Story"
"Shout For Freedom"

2004 compilation albums
Jimmy Cliff albums